The 1986–87 Boston Bruins season was the Bruins' 63rd season.

Offseason

Regular season

Final standings

Schedule and results

Notable games
November 20 - "Brawl in the Hallway" - Near the end of the second period, Chris Nilan while leaving the ice on a game misconduct for fighting and takes a swing at Ken Linseman on the Boston bench, igniting a brawl that spills up the runaway leading to the dressing rooms. Nilan and Ryan Walter are suspended for three games while Claude Lemieux sits for one game. The Canadiens are fined $9,000 and the Bruins $5,000 while the players' fines total $4,400.

Playoffs

Adams Division Semifinals

Montreal Canadiens 4, Boston Bruins 0

Player statistics

Regular season
Scoring

Goaltending

Playoffs
Scoring

Goaltending

Awards and records

Transactions

Draft picks
Boston's draft picks at the 1986 NHL Entry Draft held at the Montreal Forum in Montreal, Quebec.

Farm teams

See also
1986–87 NHL season

References

External links

Boston Bruins
Boston Bruins
Boston Bruins seasons
Boston Bruins
Boston Bruins
Bruins
Bruins